A Yoke of Gold is a 1916 American silent black and white melodrama directed by Lloyd B. Carleton and starring Dorothy Davenport and Emory Johnson. Based on an original story by Rob Wagner, it is a period piece set in the early days of the California missions.

The movie was released on August 14, 1916 by Universal.

Plot
This melodrama takes place during the  Spanish Missions period of California's history. The film is set between 1834 and 1850. During this period, a massive economic gap existed. Simultaneously, the elite continued to increase their wealth, the poor sunk further in status. The subservient poor were under the "Yoke of Gold," i.e., the yoke of the aristocracy.

Luis Lopez is smarting under this aristocratic yoke. The fiery Luis wants to become the champion of the poor. Luis fancies himself as a local Robin Hood. Luis claims he wants to rob the rich and redistribute wealth among the poor.

Jose Garcia is content to live out his life in the sleepy outskirts of San Gabriel Mission. The gullible Jose falls under the spell of Luis's fiery rhetoric. Jose also becomes determined to find a way to help the less fortunate. Luis is sensing Jose's frustration, enlists Jose to assist him in pursuing his evil designs. Since they now share common goals, the two become fast friends. Luis and Jose start developing a plan to achieve their aims.

The plan comes together. Jose will rob wealthy landowner Don Ortega portrayed by Frank Whitting. Don Ortega lives in Santa Barbara, California. Luis will rob the wealthy Don Mendoza, who resides in "the valley of the seven moons." After the men have completed both break-ins, they will travel back to San Gabriel.  They both swear to distribute all their ill-gotten gains to the poor.

Before Jose departs, he informs his devoted mother and Padre Amador of his plans.  Padre Amador and leads the Santa Barbara Mission. Since he happens to be San Gabriel visiting friends, the padre gives Jose his blessing. The priest also slips a crucifix into Jose's backpack for good luck.

Jose has a significant obstacle. Before he can rob Don Ortega, he must first cross a burning desert to reach Santa Barbara. Jose starts a journey under the blistering sun. Soon, overcome with thirst, Jose stops for a drink of water. He discovers he has lost his canteen. Jose starts to search his backpack and finds the crucifix that Padre Amador had concealed. He grabs the cross and throws it into the sand. Jose realizes his fate is sealed and lays down in the sand, waiting for death.

As luck would have it, another party was traveling behind Jose and headed in the same direction. Castro Arrellanes and his beautiful daughter – Carmen, are traveling to visit Castro's cousin. In a bit of irony, Castro's cousin is none other than Don Ortega. They come across the crucifix half-buried in the sand. Later they discover the half-dead Jose. Jose is on the edge of death. Castro and Carmen decide to finish their journey and take Jose to Don Ortega's home to recover. After they arrive at Don Ortega's home, Carmen starts nursing Jose back to good health.

Now we turn our focus to Luis Lopez. Luis arrived at the home of Don Mendoza in the valley of the seven moons.  He convinces Don Mendoza he has lost his way and requests lodging. The Mendozas take him in. After waiting for Mendoza and his wife to fall asleep, Lopez sneaks into the living room. He knows Don Mendoza has hidden bags of gold in a large chest. While stealing the gold, Mendoza's wife catches him in the act. Lopez attacks the woman, but the ensuing struggle wakes-up Don Mendoza. He rushes to his wife's aid and forces Lopez to flee. Lopez takes his gold and heads back to San Gabriel to meet up with Jose.

Jose continues to recuperate in Don Ortega's home under Carmen's tender care. But during Jose's healing process, Jose falls in love with Carmen. Now a man in love, Jose renounces his plans to rob the rich and give to the poor. Recovered, Jose heads back home to confront Luis and tell him of his change of heart.

Jose arrives in San Gabriel. Luis Lopez confronts him. Luis learns Jose had failed in his attempt to rob Ortega. Luis is beside himself with rage. Luis vows to steal Ortega's gold himself. In another starling turn, Jose learns, Lopez never intended to give the gold to the poor. From the start, Lopez had planned to keep all the gold for himself. Jose promises himself; he will not be complicit in robbing those who had befriended him. Before Luis retires for the evening, he stashed the gold he stole from Mendoza under his pillow. Luis falls to sleep. Later in the evening, Jose sneaks into Lopez's room, takes the gold, and escapes into the darkness. Jose then secures a horse and heads for Don Ortega's home in Santa Barbara.

Luis discovers what has happened. He vows to pursue the traitorous Jose and kill him. Even though Jose has a head start, Luis believes he can beat Luis to Don Ortega's home.

Both Jose and Luis ride hard and fast across the desert to Santa Barbara - the home of Don Ortega. Jose wins the race and arrives before Luis. He warns Ortega of the impending robbery, and then both men lay a trap for Lopez. They catch him in the act.

Carmen enters the picture. She believes a caring heart is beneath Luis Lopez's wicked veneer. Carmen thinks Luis can be redeemed. She pleads with Luis to turn his life around. At Carmen's bidding, padre Amador has returned to Santa Barbara. He joins Carmen in trying to convince Luis to forsake his sinful life and repent. Suddenly, Luis sees the light, heeds the call, and reforms his evil ways. Luis decides to become a monk. He enters the  Mission at Santa Barbara under Padre Amador's guidance. He will spend the rest of his days as a priest at the mission.

Later, Jose and Carmen get married and live in wedded bliss.

Cast

Production

Pre production

Development
According to the book - The Universal Story, Carl Laemmle (1867-1939) produced around 91 movies in 1916.
Lloyd B. Carleton (–1933) started working for Carl Laemmle in the Fall of 1915. Carleton arrived with impeccable credentials, having directed some 60 films for the likes of Thanhouser, Lubin, Fox, and Selig. 
Between March and December 1916, 44-year-old Lloyd Carleton directed 16 movies for Universal, starting with The Yaqui and ending with The Morals of Hilda. Emory Johnson acted in all 16 of these films. Of Carleton's total 1916 output, 11 were feature films, and the rest were two-reel shorts.

In 1916, Carleton directed 13 films pairing Dorothy Davenport and Emory Johnson. This film would be the eighth in the 13-film series. These totals show Carl Laemmle was clearly giving the Davenport-Johnson pairing one of his elite directors from the working cadre of universal directors to produce the screen chemistry Laemmle was seeking.

Casting
Dorothy Davenport (1895-1977) was an established star for Universal when the  year-old actress played Carmen. She had acted in hundreds of movies by the time she starred in this film. The majority of these films were 2-reel shorts, as was the norm in Hollywood's teen years. She had been making movies since 1910. She started dating Wally Reid when she was barely 16, and he was 20. They married in 1913. After her husband died in 1923, she used the name "Mrs. Wallace Reid" in the credits for any project she took part in.  Besides being an actress, she would eventually become a film director, producer, and writer.
Emory Johnson (1894-1960) was  years old when he starred in this movie as Jose Garcia. In January 1916, Emory signed a contract with Universal Film Manufacturing Company. Carl Laemmle of Universal Film Manufacturing Company thought he saw great potential in Johnson, so he chooses him to be Universal's new leading man. Laemmle's hope was Johnson would become another Wallace Reed. A major part of his plan was to create a movie couple that would sizzle on the silver screen. Laemmle thought Dorothy Davenport and Emory Johnson could create the chemistry he sought. Johnson and Davenport would complete 13 films together. They started with the successful feature production of Doctor Neighbor in May 1916 and ended with The Devil's Bondwoman in November 1916. After completing the last movie, Laemmle thought Johnson did not have the screen presence he wanted. He decided not to renew his contract. Johnson would make 17 movies in 1916, including eight shorts and 11 feature-length Dramas. 1916 would become the second-highest movie output of his entire acting career. Emory acted in  25 films for Universal, mostly dramas with a sprinkling of comedies and westerns.
Alfred Allen (1866-1947) was  years old when he was selected to play Luis Lopez.  Allen was highly educated, had a commanding presence and stood six feet, and weighed two hundred pounds. He got his start in the film industry at Universal city in 1913.  He landed his first role in 1915. His roles were character parts, and he played mostly fathers, villains, or ranch owners. Alfred Allen appeared in 69 features from 1916 through 1929. After acting in Heartaches he would appear in four more Davenport-Johnson projects: A Yoke of Gold, The Unattainable, The Human Gamble and Barriers of Society.
Richard Morris (1862-1924) was a  year-old actor when he played Padre Amador. He was a character actor and former opera singer known for Granny (1913). He would eventually participate in many Johnson projects, including  |In the Name of the Law (1922),  The Third Alarm (1922),  The West~Bound Limited (1923), The Mailman (1923) until his untimely death in 1924.

Screenplay
The movie is based on a story by Rob Wagner (1872-1942) and a screenplay by Calder Johnstone (1880-1958).

Filming
Alternate title
The film was also known as In The Days of the Missions. The film's name has also been cited as The Yoke of Gold.

Post production
Studio
The movie was filmed at Universal Studios located in  Universal City, California.

Release and reception
Official release

The film was officially released on August 14, 1916.

Advertising
Based on an American Film Institute standard, films with a running time of forty-five minutes or longer are considered feature films. In 1915, feature films were becoming more the trend in Hollywood.  In 1916, Universal formed a three-tier branding system for their releases. Universal films decided to label their films according to the size of their budget and status. Universal, unlike the top-tier studios, did not own any theaters to market its feature films. Universal gave theater owners and audiences a quick reference guide by branding their product.  Branding would help theater owners judge films they were about to lease and help fans decide which movies they wanted to see.

Universal released three different types of feature motion pictures:B movies (Hollywood Golden Age)#Roots of the B movie: 1910s–1920s
 Red feather Photoplays – low-budget feature films
 Bluebird Photoplays – mainstream feature release and more ambitious productions
 Jewel – prestige motion pictures featuring high budgets using prominent actors

This film carried Universal's "Red Feather" brand, designating a low-budget feature film.

Reviews
Melodrama films have plots appealing to the raised passions of the audience. They concentrate on family issues, direct their attention to a victim character, and develop the themes of duty and love. The melodramatic format shows the characters working through their struggles with persistence, sacrificial deeds, and courage.

The critics generally panned this movie.

Critical Response
In the September 16, 1916 issue of the New York Clipper, the reviewer writes
Here we have the "Red Feather" stuff at what seems to be its lowest ebb   The story is weak, the direction fair at best, the acting "most ordinary", and the general characteristics, designate "The Yoke of Gold" as a puerile affair.

In the September issue of the Moving Picture World,  Robert C. McElravy reviewed this movie and stated:
A weak story is its main drawback, and this is the more noticeable because so many strong tales have been woven about the early days of California There is a great deal of quiet beauty in these offerings and a strong moral purpose in the story.  But these things do not compensate for the slow action and lack of dramatic strength

In the September issue of the Motion Picture News,  Peter Milne was more upbeat in his review.  He observed:
Aided by some beautiful scenes and good photography, the picture leaves little to be desired from an artistic standpoint . . .  With Emory Johnson and Dorothy Davenport in the roles of lovers and Alfred Allen as the bandit, the picture has been well-acted.

Box Office
The September issue of the New York Clipper'' estimated the budget of this film at no more than US$3,000. They used this figure to explain the poor quality of the feature film. They also pointed out "...the big feature companies are to-day spending from US$5,000 to US$20,000 on a five-reeler.

Preservation status
Since no records detail this film's status, it is presumed all copies of this film are lost.

Gallery

The Players

Stills from the motion picture A Yoke of Gold

References

External links

Katchmer, George A. A Biographical Dictionary of Silent Film Western Actors and Actresses, McFarland, 2002, p. 204.
List of Universal Pictures films (1912–1919)
Universal Pictures
List of American films of 1916
 
 
 
 Copyright notice recorded at:

1916 lost films
1916 drama films
1916 films
American black-and-white films
American silent feature films
Lost American films
Silent American drama films
Universal Pictures films
Films directed by Lloyd B. Carleton
1910s English-language films
1910s American films